This is a list of fellows of the Royal Society elected in 1707.

Fellows
 Thomas Ayres (d. 1715)
 Thomas Frankland (c. 1683–1747)
 William Frankland (d. 1714)
 James Graham, 1st Duke of Montrose (c. 1680–1742)
 Rowland Holt (c. 1652–1711)
 Thomas Hoy (1659–c. 1718)
 John Ker, 1st Duke of Roxburghe (c. 1680–1741)
 Benjamin Morland (c. 1653–1733)
 Henry Plumtre (d. 1746)
 Thomas Trevor, 1st Baron Trevor (1658–1730)
 James Venables (d. 1737)

References

1707
1707 in science
1707 in England